German submarine U-358 was a Type VIIC U-boat of Nazi Germany's Kriegsmarine during World War II.

She carried out five patrols before being sunk north of the Azores by British warships on 1 March 1944.

She sank four ships and one warship.

Design
German Type VIIC submarines were preceded by the shorter Type VIIB submarines. U-358 had a displacement of  when at the surface and  while submerged. She had two shafts and two  propellers.

U-358 was fitted with five  torpedo tubes (four fitted at the bow and one at the stern), fourteen torpedoes, one  SK C/35 naval gun, 220 rounds, and two twin  C/30 anti-aircraft guns. The boat had a complement of between forty-four and sixty.

Service history
The submarine was laid down on 25 June 1940 at the Flensburger Schiffbau-Gesellschaft yard at Flensburg as yard number 477, launched on 30 April 1942 and commissioned on 15 August under the command of Oberleutnant zur See Rolf Manke.

First patrol
The boat's first patrol was in two parts; it began with her departure from Kiel on 12 January 1943. On the 26th, she sank the Nortind east of Cape Farewell, (Greenland). She arrived at St. Nazaire in occupied France on 8 March.

Second patrol
Having left St. Nazaire (which would be her base for the rest of her career) on 11 April 1943, U-358 sank the Bristol City and the Wentworth; she was attacked south of Cape Farewell by the British corvette  commanded by Lieutenant Robert Atkinson and badly damaged.

Third patrol
The submarine's third foray took her south, as far as the Gulf of Guinea, off the west African coast. At 84 days, it was her longest patrol.

Fourth patrol
Sortie number four saw the boat northeast of the Azores.

Fifth patrol and loss
U-358 had left St. Nazaire on 14 February 1944. Gore and Garlies had to break off the assault and sail to Gibraltar to re-fuel. The U-boat sank Gould on 1 March, but Affleck persisted with the attack, sinking U-358 with gunfire after the submarine was forced to the surface.

50 men died in the U-boat; there was one survivor, Alfons Eckert.

Wolfpacks
U-358 took part in eleven wolfpacks, namely:
 Haudegen (27 January – 2 February 1943) 
 Nordsturm (2 – 9 February 1943) 
 Haudegen (9 – 15 February 1943) 
 Taifun (15 – 20 February 1943) 
 Without name (15 – 18 April 1943) 
 Specht (19 April – 4 May 1943) 
 Fink (4 – 6 May 1943) 
 Schill (2 – 16 November 1943) 
 Schill 1 (16 – 22 November 1943) 
 Weddigen (22 November – 7 December 1943) 
 Preussen (22 February – 1 March 1944)

Summary of raiding history

References

Notes

Citations

Bibliography

External links

German Type VIIC submarines
U-boats commissioned in 1942
U-boats sunk in 1944
U-boats sunk by British warships
1942 ships
Ships built in Flensburg
World War II submarines of Germany
Maritime incidents in March 1944